Wacław Kajetan Sieroszewski (24 August 1858 – 20 April 1945) was a Polish writer, Polish Socialist Party activist, and soldier in the World War I-era Polish Legions (decorated with the Virtuti Militari). For activities subversive of the Russian Empire, he had spent many years in Siberian exile.

Sieroszewski's Siberian experiences became the subjects of his many stories and novels — Na kresach lasów (At the Edge of the Woods, 1894), Dno nędzy (The Depths of Misery, 1900), Risztau (1899), Ucieczka (The Escape, 1904), Zamorski diabeł (The Overseas Devil, 1900). He also authored the popular Bajki (Fables, 1910). His 12 lat w kraju Jakutów (12 years in the Yakut country, 1900) provides the first extensive ethnographic account of the Yakut people.

Whilst in Paris in 1910, he heard that Jan Wacław Machajski had been asking his friend Stefan Żeromski to provide a reference so that Machajski's wife would be employed by Kazimierz Dłuski. Having heard rumours circulated by the Polish Social Democratic Party of Galicia that Machajski was a terrorist, Sieroszewski wrote to Dłuski warning against getting involved with the Machajskis. When this letter fell into the hands of the police, they promptly arrested Machajski.

Professional background
Under the Second Polish Republic, Sieroszewski was a senator, and president of the Union of Polish Writers (Związek Zawodowy Literatów Polskich, 1927–30) and the Polish Academy of Literature (Polska Akademia Literatury, 1933–1939).

Selected filmography
 Exile to Siberia (1930)

References

 "Sieroszewski Wacław," Encyklopedia Polski, p. 614 et passim.

External links
 
 
 

1858 births
1945 deaths
People from Wołomin County
People from Warsaw Governorate
Government ministers of Poland
Senators of the Second Polish Republic (1935–1938)
19th-century Polish novelists
20th-century Polish novelists
Polish male novelists
19th-century Polish male writers
20th-century Polish male writers
Members of the Polish Academy of Literature
Polish exiles in the Russian Empire
Polish soldiers
Polish legionnaires (World War I)
Recipients of the Virtuti Militari